The Research Institute for Fragrance Materials, Inc. (RIFM) is the international scientific authority for the safe use of fragrance materials. RIFM generates, evaluates and distributes scientific data on the safety assessment of fragrance raw materials found in personal and household care products. Through extensive research, testing and constant monitoring of all scientific literature available, RIFM maintains its database as the most comprehensive source worldwide of physical-chemical, toxicological and eco-toxicological data associated with known fragrance and flavor materials. All of RIFM’s scientific findings are evaluated by an independent Expert Panel—an international group of dermatologists, pathologists, toxicologists, reproduction, respiratory and environmental scientists. The Expert Panel evaluates the safety of fragrance ingredients under conditions of intended use and publishes their results in peer-reviewed scientific journals. The decisions of the Expert Panel regarding restrictions of use are also published in the International Fragrance Association (IFRA) Standards.

External links

Perfumes
Cosmetic trade associations
Toxicology organizations